Pseudocophotis kontumensis is a species of agamid lizard. It is endemic to Vietnam.

References

Pseudocophotis
Reptiles of Vietnam
Reptiles described in 2007
Taxa named by Natalia B. Ananjeva
Taxa named by Nikolai Loutseranovitch Orlov
Taxa named by Truong Quang Nguyen
Taxa named by Roman A. Nazarov